Mariama Dalanda Barry (born April 1, 1991 in Conakry) is a Guinean taekwondo practitioner. She competed for the women's welterweight division at the 2008 Summer Olympics in Beijing. Barry was eliminated in the first round, after being defeated by Germany's Helena Fromm, who eventually won the bronze medal in this event, with a score of 1–6.

References

External links
NBC Olympics Profile

1991 births
Living people
Guinean female taekwondo practitioners
Olympic taekwondo practitioners of Guinea
Taekwondo practitioners at the 2008 Summer Olympics
Sportspeople from Conakry